Robert Davell,  DCL was  an English priest in the 16th century.

Davell was  educated at the University of Oxford. He  was Archdeacon of Northumberland from 1518 until his death in 1557.

Notes

16th-century English Anglican priests
Archdeacons of Northumberland
Alumni of the University of Oxford
1557 deaths